Tobias S. Buckell (born 1979) is a New York Times Bestselling author and World Fantasy Award winner born in the Caribbean. He grew up in Grenada and spent time in the British and US Virgin Islands, which influence much of his work. His novels and almost one hundred stories have been translated into nineteen different languages. His work has been nominated for awards like the Hugo, Nebula, World Fantasy, and the Astounding Award for Best New Science Fiction Author. His 2008 novel, Halo: The Cole Protocol, made The New York Times Best Seller list. He currently lives in Bluffton, Ohio, where he works as an instructor at the Stonecoast MFA in the Creative Writing program.

Biography
Buckell was born in 1979 in Grenada in the Caribbean, where he was raised on a boat. In 1999, he attended Clarion Workshop. Not long after that, he made his first sale, "Fish Merchant", to Scott Edelman at Science Fiction Age.  The story appeared in the March, 2000 issue.  About the time of the sale, his story "In Orbite Medievali" won a quarterly contest for the Writers of the Future.  Since then his stories have appeared in a variety of places, including the magazines Analog and Nature, and the anthologies New Voices in Science Fiction, Men Writing Science Fiction As Women, and So Long Been Dreaming. Buckell has both ADHD and dyslexia.

His first novel, Crystal Rain, was published in February 2006 by Tor Books.  His second novel, Ragamuffin was published in 2007, and was nominated for the illustrious Nebula award for that year. Sly Mongoose, his third novel, was published in August 2008.  His first short story collection, Tides from the New Worlds, was published as a signed limited edition hardcover by Wyrm Publishing in April 2009.

On June 16, 2008, Buckell was announced as the author for the sixth novel in the Halo book series titled Halo: The Cole Protocol, named after military procedures made to prevent the Covenant from obtaining crucial information, such as the location of Earth. The novel was published in November 2008. In December, the novel debuted at #4 on the New York Times Best Seller list for paperback trade fiction. He also wrote the collaborative short story collection Halo Evolutions: Essential Tales of the Halo Universe along with Karen Traviss, Eric Nylund and many other authors, which was released in November 2009.

His latest novel, The Stranger the in Citadel, was released on Audible Originals in May 2021.

He currently lives in Bluffton, Ohio with his wife and two daughters, where he teaches Creative Writing at Bluffton University and is also an instructor at the Stonecoast MFA in Creative Writing program.

Works

Xenowealth series 
 Crystal Rain (2006)
 Ragamuffin (2007)
 Sly Mongoose (2008)
 Apocalypse Ocean (2012)
Xenowealth: A Collection (2016)

Halo novelizations 

 Halo: The Cole Protocol (2008)
 Halo: Envoy (2017)

Stand-alone novels 
 Arctic Rising (2012)
 Hurricane Fever (2014)
 The Trove (2018)
The Tangled Lands, co-authored with Paolo Bacigalupi (2018)
The Stranger in the Citadel (2021)

Novellas 
 Stochasticity (2008)
Byways – METAtropolis: Cascadia (2010)
The Executioness (2011)
Tensegrity – METAtropolis: Greenspace (2013)

Collections 
 Tides from the New Worlds (2009)
 Nascence (2011)
 Mitigated Futures (2012)
It’s All Just a Draft (2019)
Shoggoths in Traffic and Other Stories (2021)

As editor
Diverse Energies, co-edited with Joe Monti (2012)
The Stories We Tell: Bermuda Anthology of Science Fiction, Fantasy and Horror (2017)
Reclaim, Restore, Return: Futurist Tales from the Caribbean, co-edited with Karen Lord (2020)

Short stories 
 "Waiting For The Zephyr" in Jackhammer (June, 1999)
"In Orbite Medievali" – Writers of The Future (September ’00):
"Spurn Babylon" – Whispers From The Cotton Tree Root (October ’00)
"Steam" – Would That It Were (January 2001)
"All Her Children Fought" – Speculon (March 2001)
"Trinkets" – The Book of All Flesh (October 2001)
"A Green Thumb" – Analog (July/August 2002)
"Kisses" - Vestal Review (July 2002)
"Nord’s Gambit" – switch.blade (July 2002)
"The Shackles of Freedom" (with Mike Resnick) – With A Little Help From My Friends (Aug. 2002)
"Tides" – Ideomancer Unbound (December 2002)
"Death’s Dreadlocks" – Mojo: Conjure Stories (April 2003)
"Smooth Talking" – Marsdust (Oct. 2003)
"In The Heart of Kalikuata" – Men Writing SF As Women (November, 2003)
"Four Eyes" – New Voices in Science Fiction (December 2003)
"Her" – Fortean Bureau (January 2004)
"Necahual" – So Long Been Dreaming: Postcolonial Science Fiction and Fantasy (May 2004)
"Aerophilia" – All Star Zeppelin Stories (Sep. 2004)
"Anakoinosis" – I Alien (April 2005)
"Toy Planes" – Nature Magazine (Oct 14th, 2005)
" Shoah Sry" (with Ilsa J. Bick) – Subterranean Magazine (Spring 2006)
"The Silver Streak" – Space Cadets (Aug. 2006)
"The Last Twilight" – Golden Age SF: Tales of a Bygone Future (Aug. 2006)
"The Duel" – Electric Velocipede #11 (Nov. 2006)
"Io, Robot" – Visual Journeys: a tribute to space art (summer 2007)
"Manumission" – Baen’s Universe (April, 2008)
"The People’s Machine" – Sideways in Crime (Summer, 2008)
"Resistance" – Seeds of Change (Summer, 2008)
"Mitigation" (w/ Karl Schroeder) – Fast Forward 2 (Fall, 2008)
"Something in The Rock" – Tides From The New Worlds (March, 2009)
"Placa Del Fuego" – Clarkesworld Magazine (July, 2009)
"Dirt" – HALO: Evolutions (November, 2009)
"A Jar of Goodwill" – Clarkesworld Magazine (May, 2010)
"On The Eve of the Fall of Habesh" – Speculative Horizons (December, 2010)
T"he Fall of Alacan" – Subterranean Magazine (Spring 2011)
"The Universe Reef"– Nature Magazine (May, 2011)
"Love Comes To Abyssal City" – Hot And Steamy: Tales of Steampunk Romance (June, 2011)
"Mirror, Mirror" – Subterranean Magazine (Special YA edition, Summer 2011)
"Lonely Islands" – MIT Technology Review (Nov. 2011, TR:SF edition)
"A Militant Peace" (w/ David Klecha) – Clarkesworld Magazine (November, 2011)
"A Tinker of Warhoon" – Under the Moons of Mars: New Adventures on Barsoom (Spring, 2012)
"Press Enter to Execute" – Fireside Magazine #1 (Spring, 2012)
"Jungle Walkers" (w/ David Klecha) – Armored (March, 2012)
"A Game of Rats and Dragon" – Mitigated Futures (June, 2012)
"The Rainy Season" – Mitigated Futures (August, 2012)
"The Found Girl" (w/ David Klecha) – Clarkesworld Magazine (September, 2012)
"The Seafarer" – Subterranean Magazine (Spring, 2013)
"The Rydr Express" – The New Hero II (May, 2013)
"A Pressure of Shadows" – Schemers (November, 2013)

"System Reset" – The End is Nigh (March, 2014)
"Ambassador to the Dinosaurs" – The Book of Silverberg (April, 2014)
"Sundown" – Dead Man’s Hand (May, 2014)
"Help Fund Taphognosis Industries" – Help Fund My Robot Army (July, 2014)
"A Cold Heart" – Upgraded (July, 2014)
"Rules of Enchantment" (w/ David Klecha) – Operation Arcana (Apr. 2015)
"Pale Blue Memories" in Old Venus (anthology) (2015) 
"Ratcatcher" – Xenowealth: A Collection (Dec. 2015)
 "Oasis" in Halo: Fractures (anthology) (2016) 
"The Fish Merchant -Science Fiction Age" in Clarkesworld Magazine (2016)
"Oasis" – Fractures: Extraordinary Tales from the Halo Canon (Sep. 2016)
"The Mighty Slinger" (w/ Karen Lord) – Bridging Infinity (Nov. 2016)
"Zen and the Art of Starship Maintenance" – Cosmic Powers (Apr. 2017)
"Shoggoths in Traffic" – Lightspeed Magazine (Sep. 2017)
"High Awareness (with David Brin) – Overview: Stories in the Stratosphere (Sep. 2017)
"A World to Die For" – Clarkesworld Magazine (January, 2018)
"Sunset" – Lightspeed Magazine (May, 2018)
"A Different Kind of Place" – Apex Magazine (Jun. 2018)
"The Blindfold" in A People’s Future of the United States (Feb., 2019)
"The Galactic Tourist Industrial Complex" in New Suns: Original Speculative Fiction by People of Color (anthology) (March, 2019)
"Apocalypse Considered Through a Helix of Semiprecious Foods and Recipes" in The Magazine of Fantasy and Science Fiction (May/June, 2019)
"N-Coin" in Apex Magazine (May, 2019)
"Through Sparks in Morning’s Dawn" in Wastelands: The New Apocalypse (anthology) (2019)
"By the Warmth of Her Calculus" in Mission Critical (2019)
"Zombie Capitalism" in Motherboard Magazine (March, 2020)
Scar Tissue in Slate Magazine (May, 2020)
"Idle Hands" in The Dystopia Triptych #1: Ignorance is Strength (anthology) (2020)
"The Fruits of Their Labor" in The Dystopia Triptych #2: Burn the Ashes (anthology) (2020)
"The Machine Votes" in The Dystopia Triptych #3: Or Else the Light (anthology) (2020)
"The Machine That Would Rewild Humanity" in Escape Pod: The Science Fiction Anthology (2020)
"Category Six:" in Reclaim, Restore, Return: Futurist Tales from the Caribbean (anthology) (2020)

References

External links
 
 
 Interview with Tobias S. Buckell at SFFWorld.com
 Interview on wotmania.com
 Interview on the SciFiDimensions Podcast
 Interview at Clarkesworld Magazine Issue 30, March 2009
 Arctic Rising review at Upcoming4.me
 The Tobias Buckell Papers, 1994- 2009, at Northern Illinois University Libraries

1979 births
Living people
Grenadian male writers
People from Bluffton, Ohio
Grenadian emigrants to the United States
Writers from Ohio
Grenadian science fiction writers
Grenadian novelists
Grenadian short story writers
United States Virgin Islands writers
Male novelists
Male short story writers
20th-century short story writers
21st-century novelists
21st-century short story writers
20th-century male writers
21st-century male writers